was a career naval officer in the Imperial Japanese Navy, and a pioneer submarine commander, known primarily as the commanding officer during the sinking of Submarine No.6.

Biography
Born in Mikata District Fukui prefecture (present-day city of Wakasa, Fukui), to the family of a Shinto priest, Sakuma graduated from the 29th class of the Imperial Japanese Naval Academy in 1901. One of his classmates was the future Navy Minister and Prime Minister of Japan Mitsumasa Yonai. He was assigned to the cruiser  shortly before the start of the Russo-Japanese War. He subsequently served with the 15th Torpedo Boat Flotilla, and was on board the cruiser  during the Battle of Tsushima on May 26, 1905.

He started to get involved in the submarine service in 1906, first taking the command of the No.4 submarine, and eventually the Japan-built Holland-type No.6  in 1908.

On April 15, 1910, while engaged in a practice dive in the Inland Sea off of the coast of Yamaguchi Prefecture, the submarine suffered a malfunction resulting in the loss of the ship and crew. Two days later the submarine was recovered by Japanese authorities, and Sakuma's journal was found, with a detailed analysis of what may have caused the accident, ending with an apology to Emperor Meiji for the loss of the submarine and 14 crew members before the ship's air ran out. The journal was posted in later press reports, and Sakuma became a posthumous national hero and an example for courage and steadfastness within the Imperial Japanese Navy.

References
Dupuy, Trevor N. Harper Encyclopedia of Military Biography, New York, 1992
Nishida, Imperial Japanese Navy (written in Japanese)

1879 births
1910 deaths
Imperial Japanese Navy officers
Military personnel from Fukui Prefecture
Japanese military personnel of the Russo-Japanese War